Edi Horvat (born 28 November 1998) is a Croatian footballer.

Club career
Horvat began his professional career in 2017 at NK Aluminij Kidričevo in the Slovenian PrvaLiga, before a loan spell that became permanent at NK Brežice 1919, scoring five goals in 21 appearances across two seasons. Before moving to Slovenia, Horvat had recorded 16 goals in 20 games playing in his home country for the NK Inter Zaprešić Under-19 team.

In 2019, Horvat signed with Slovenian Second League side NK Fužinar, where he scored 21 goals in 51 appearances.

On 11 January 2022, it was announced that Horvat would join USL Championship side  Birmingham Legion ahead of their 2022 season. He made his debut for Birmingham on 26 March 2022, starting against Colorado Springs Switchbacks. Following the 2022 season, Horvat was released by Birmingham.

References

1998 births
Living people
Footballers from Zagreb
Association football forwards
Croatian footballers
NK Aluminij players
NK Brežice 1919 players
NK Fužinar players
Birmingham Legion FC players
Slovenian PrvaLiga players
Slovenian Second League players
USL Championship players
Croatian expatriate footballers
Expatriate footballers in Slovenia
Croatian expatriate sportspeople in Slovenia
Expatriate soccer players in the United States
Croatian expatriate sportspeople in the United States